Luc Zeebroek (born 5 May 1956), better known as Kamagurka, is a Belgian cartoonist, playwright, comic strip artist, painter, comedian, comedic singer and television producer, known for the absurd nature of his work. He created various comic strip characters, but "Bert" is the most well known. He also writes the scenarios for Herr Seele's comic strip, Cowboy Henk.

Early life and education 
Luc Zeebroek was born on 5 May 1956 in Nieuwpoort in Belgium.

Kamagurka studied Art in Bruges and later performed studies at the Royal Academy of Fine Arts in Ghent. However, he quit school before he would graduate.

During a schooltrip in Paris Kamagurka decided to visit to the editorial building of the magazine Hara Kiri on his own. Only twenty years old, he ended up going there every two weeks to stay there for three days. Kamagurka still believes this to be his true education and the foundation of the rest of his career.

Career
In 1972 he made his debut as cartoonist in De Zeewacht. Three years later he became the regular cartoonist at the weekly magazine HUMO, where he introduced cartoons inspired by the absurd and shocking comics and cartoons of Robert Crumb, Roland Topor and the controversial French magazine Hara Kiri. In those first years the magazine received dozens of angry readers' letters from people who didn't understand or enjoy his work, which they deemed "too vulgar". This transformed him into a cult artist. He remains the house cartoonist of Humo to this day, despite other cartoonists being published as well.

Since the 1980s he also made a few cartoons with Herr Seele, with whom he also made several radio ("Studio Kafka", "Kamagurkistan") and televisions shows (like "Lava", "Johnnywood", "Wees blij met wat je hebt" and "Bob en George"). Since 1981 they also make the comic Cowboy Henk, with Kamagurka writing the jokes and Seele making the drawings.

Kamagurka also paints and performs theater throughout Flanders and The Netherlands.

He has made music since the beginning of the 80s with singles as "Constant Degoutant", "Marjoleintje", "Een klein leger, maar een dik leger" (1981) and one censured by national radio "Weg met Boudewijn. Leve Fabiola" (Translation: "Boudewijn go home! Long live Fabiola!"). They called themselves Kamagurka en de Vlaamse Primitieven. In 2000 he released a new album called: "Oh Sabrina, wat heb je met mijn snor gedaan?" with singles like the title song and "Nee, mijn lief: je bent niet te dik." He has also designed album covers for Raymond van het Groenewoud and his own albums.

In 1985 he received the Geuzenprijs for his entire oeuvre.

Since from 2002 he made weekly guest contributions to De Laatste Show. In 2005 he also created a theater production with Jules Deelder: "Kamadeeldra".

Since 2006 he has been making segments for the TV show "Man bijt Hond" with the weekly shorts De grens.

Paintings
During the Kamalmanak project he started to make short movies for the digital Dutch site NRC TV. While filming one of these short films he invented a new art movement called Accidentalism ("Accidentally made"). He created a portrait of an unknown person, as he saw him/her with his own eye. Afterwards he asked people on camera which person this man or woman on the painting resembled, and strange enough each time there was someone who could proof the likeness by showing a photo.

In 2008 Kamagurka did a project called Kamalmanak, in which he painted daily a painting, in total 366, because 2008 was a leap-year. It is also the title of the book in which these paintings are pictured. The project was sponsored by business man Marc Coucke, member of the management of the company Omega Pharma. Coucke is an art lover and a big fan of Luc Zeebroek. In these paintings Kamagurka tries to look at the world with an amount of absurd humor. He was inspired by various art movements, such as cubism and pop-art. His intention was to make his international breakthrough.

After this he kept painting in the same style, but with the slight difference that he kept doing it every day, but didn't necessarily finish a painting each time. He made a series he called "Veluxart", because the theme he painted was always close to a roof window. He painted a number of comic book characters (such as Tintin, The Smurfs, Batman) and cartoon characters (Mickey Mouse, Goofy, Popeye, Fred Flintstone, Mijnheer de Uil) in a style he nicknamed Neo-cubism. He tried to imagine how Picasso, Georges Braque or Juan Gris would have treated these subjects.

Another series were the "Spiegeleipaintings" (Fried egg paintings: a chicken upon the yolk of a fried egg). He continued with this theme and changed the chicken by i.e. three crosses on the Golgotha or by drawing another fried egg.

He also made an official portrait of Queen Beatrix with a beard stubble. This is, according to the painter, because "a queen changes into a king if you wait long enough." In other paintings, he's strongly influenced by Piet Mondriaan or Peter Paul Rubens or he uses the theme of another painter to make an own original work, such as "Le Déjeuner sur l'herbe" by Édouard Manet, which he transformed into "Déjeuner sous l'herbe".

Trivia
 Since 1978 he has won without interruption the annual trophy for "Best Graphic Artist", elected by the readers of the magazine HUMO. In 2010 he was beaten for the first time by Jonas Geirnaert. He ended number 4 in the top-10.
 In the comic strip series The Adventures of Nero by Marc Sleen in the album  "De Smaragdgroene Pletskop"  a colonel appears with the name "Kamagurka" (line 71).
 The group Osdorp Posse sampled a part of Kamagurka's Kamiel Kafka performances in their song "Sam Sam" from their album "Tegenstrijd" (2003).
 Since his youth Kamagurka is a fan of the football squad KV Oostende, in which he's in the board of directors. He designed the clubs' mascot. In 2009 he got a stadium prohibit of three months because he had entered the playing field during the game in March 2009.

Honours and awards
  Bronzen Adhemar (1978)
  Louis Paul Boonprijs (1978)
  Humo's Pop Poll - Best Cartoonist (1978->2010)
  Geuzenprijs (1985)
  Stripschapprijs (1993)
  Press Cartoon Prize Belgium (2001)
  Sondermann Bernd-Pfarr-Sonderpreis (2009)
  Angoulême Prize for Inheritance (2014)
  Inktspotprijs (2021)

References

External links 

 

1956 births
Living people
20th-century Belgian painters
21st-century Belgian painters
Belgian comics writers
Belgian comics artists
Belgian male comedians
Belgian comedy musicians
Belgian editorial cartoonists
Belgian experimental musicians
Belgian radio presenters
Belgian television presenters
Belgian male singers
Belgian surrealist artists
Flemish television writers
Male television writers
Underground cartoonists
People from Nieuwpoort, Belgium
Album-cover and concert-poster artists
Charlie Hebdo people
Raw (magazine)
Dutch-language singers of Belgium
Winners of the Stripschapsprijs
-->